Ahead of the Class is a single British television drama film, based on the book of the same name by Marie Stubbs, that first broadcast on ITV1 on 30 January 2005. Adapted for television by Robert Jones and directed by Adrian Shergold, the film stars Julie Walters as Stubbs, a diminutive Glaswegian headmistress who takes on the challenge of improving the fortunes of St George's Roman Catholic Secondary School in North West London.

Reece Dinsdale and Hannah Yelland are credited as the other two principal cast members, who star as Stubbs' deputies, Sean Devlin and Tracy O'Leary respectively. The film was shot on location at the former Kingsland Secondary School in Dalston, Hackney, London. The film drew 9.6 million viewers on its debut broadcast. The film was nominated for two awards at the Royal Television Society Awards 2006, in the categories of Best Single Drama and Best Actress, for Julie Walters. A DVD of the film was released on 21 May 2007.

Premise
Marie Stubbs is close to the age of retirement. After leaving her role as headteacher at The Douay Martyrs School, Ickenham, she takes over as headmistress at St. George's Roman Catholic Secondary School, which is facing closure after its previous headmaster, Philip Lawrence, was murdered in 1995, whilst breaking up a fight between his pupils and students from a rival school. The school is suffering from a multitude of problems, including bullying, gang culture, persistent absence and vandalism. Staff morale is at an all-time low, and Ofsted have placed the school in special measures.

Cast
 Julie Walters as Marie, Lady Stubbs, headteacher
 Reece Dinsdale as Sean Devlin, deputy headteacher
 Hannah Yelland as Tracy O'Leary, deputy headteacher
 Inday Ba as Trudy Gower, teacher
 Michelle Fairley as Sonia Venning, teacher
 Danny Nussbaum as Tomas Moreira, school caretaker
 Tony Slattery as Stuart Stiles, teacher
 Alan McKenna as Simon Linder, teacher
 Anton Lesser as Graham Ranger, Ofsted inspector
 Adrian Rawlins as Tony Mackersie, diocesan representative
 Gerard Canning as Father George Dangerfield, school priest
 Amy Jo Lamb as Debbie Campbell, student
 Frances Gold as Lusha, student
 Callum McNab as Jason Foley, student
 Heshima Thompson as Rory, student
 Chris Hemsworth as Michael Reynolds, teacher

References

External links
 

2000s English-language films
2005 television films
2005 films
British television films
ITV television dramas
British films based on actual events
Films directed by Adrian Shergold